Byron Chief-Moon is an Aboriginal Canadian actor, choreographer, dancer, playwright, and founder of the Coyote Arts Percussive Performance Association, a dance theatre company.

Early life and education 
Chief-Moon was born in Carlsbad, California, and is a member of the Kainai Nation of the Blackfoot Confederacy in southern Alberta.

Career 
Chief-Moon has made appearances in several well-known American and Canadian TV shows (such as MacGyver, North of 60, Stargate SG-1, Da Vinci's Inquest, Highlander: The Series, and appeared on Walker, Texas Ranger, as well as several feature films.

He appeared in Disney's White Fang 2: Myth of the White Wolf, a sequel to the White Fang.

Some of his dance theatre pieces have included Possessed, Dancing voices and Voices, as well as Jonesing, an experimental video dance piece. He is also known for his choreography work on the documentary Echoes of the Sisters and the dance film Quest. Chief-Moon plays the Quileute chief Taha Aki in The Twilight Saga: Eclipse.

Personal life 
Chief-Moon is a father of three children.

Filmography

Film

Television

External links 
 

Male actors from Alberta
First Nations male actors
Living people
Male actors from San Diego
Year of birth missing (living people)
People from Carlsbad, California
Canadian male television actors
Canadian male film actors

References 

Kainai Nation people